The Auguetbrücke is a bridge over the Aare between the municipalities of Muri bei Bern and Belp in the Canton of Bern in Switzerland.

During the 18th and at the beginning of the 19th century, four ferries crossed the Aare river between Bern and Thun. Increasing freight traffic from local farms at the beginning of the 19th century necessitated a bridge in the Hunzigenau. Construction of the Hunzigenbrücke began in the spring of 1835 and was completed by the summer of 1836.

Construction of the N6 national road through the Aare river valley required a connection to the cantonal highway between the districts of Konolfingen and Seftigen. This would have increased the river crossing traffic beyond the old wooden bridge's capacity, so a new concrete bridge was built and after 136 years the wooden bridge became superfluous.

After much discussion, the bridge was moved to Auguet. The bridge was renamed Auguetbrücke and opened to the public as a footbridge in 1974.

A commemorative plaque on the bridge reads "Hunzigenbrücke erbaut 1835 in der Hunzigenau. Versetzt und restauriert 1973-74 / Umbenannt in Auguetbrugg. Die Brücke steht unter dem Schutz des Bundes.", or roughly translated "Hunzigen Bridge built in 1835 at the Hunzigenau. Moved and restored 1973-74 / Renamed Auguetbrugg. The bridge is under the protection of the Swiss Confederation."

Bridges over the Aare
Pedestrian bridges in Switzerland
Covered bridges in Switzerland
Bridges completed in 1836
19th-century architecture in Switzerland